The Red Oak Independent School District is a school district in northern Ellis County, Texas (USA).

The district serves the communities of Pecan Hill and Red Oak, along with some portions of Glenn Heights, Oak Leaf, Ovilla, and Waxahachie.

In 2010, the school district was rated "Recognized" by the Texas Education Agency.

Schools

Elementary  schools
Donald T. Shields Elementary (Grades K-5)
Eastridge Elementary (K-5)
Red Oak Elementary (K-5)
Wooden Elementary (K–5)
Russell P Schupmann Elementary (PK -5)

Intermediate schools
Red Oak Sixth Grade Center (6)

Middle schools
Red Oak Middle School (7–8)

High schools
Red Oak High School (9–12)

Alternative education
Acorn Academy

See also
List of school districts in Texas

References

External links

School districts in Ellis County, Texas